The 1974–75 Indiana Hoosiers men's basketball team represented Indiana University, led by fourth-year head coach Bobby Knight. The team played its home games on campus in Bloomington at Assembly Hall, and was a member of the Big Ten Conference.

The Hoosiers finished the regular season with a 29–0 record, and won the Big Ten Conference by six games at  They began the season third in the polls and were top-ranked since January 7. When combined with the following year, Indiana won 37 consecutive Big Ten games. The Hoosiers won their conference games by an average of 22.8 points. However, in an 83–82 win against Purdue on February 22, they lost consensus All-American forward Scott May to a broken left arm. The Hoosiers were so dominant that four starters – Scott May, Steve Green, Kent Benson, and Quinn Buckner – were named to the five-man All-Big Ten team following the regular season. With May's injury keeping him to seven minutes of play, the No. 1 Hoosiers lost to Kentucky  in the Elite Eight of the NCAA Tournament and finished the season at

Roster

Regular season game against Kentucky
On December 7, 1974, Indiana and Kentucky met in the regular season in Bloomington with a 98–74 Indiana win. Near the end of the game, Indiana coach Bobby Knight went to the Kentucky bench where the official was standing to complain about a call. Before he left, Knight hit Kentucky coach Joe B. Hall in the back of the head. UK's assistant coach Lynn Nance, a former FBI agent who was about 6 feet 5 inches, had to be restrained by Hall from hitting Knight. Hall later said, "It publicly humiliated me."

Knight said the slap to the head was something he has done, "affectionately" to his own players for years. "But maybe someone would not like that", he said. "If Joe didn't like it, I offer an apology. I don't apologize for the intent." ... "Hall and I have been friends for a long time", Knight said. "If he wants to dissolve the friendship, that's up to him." Knight blamed the furor on Hall, noting in his inimitable style, "If it was meant to be malicious, I'd have blasted him into the seats."

NCAA tournament
Following the one-sided regular season game in early December, Indiana and Kentucky met again in the 1975 Elite Eight in Dayton, Ohio, the Mideast regional final. Entering that game on March 22, the top-ranked Hoosiers had a 34-game winning streak and Kentucky (24–4) was ranked fifth. However, Indiana had lost star player Scott May to a broken arm in the regular season finale against Purdue. May scored 25 points in the regular season IU-UK meeting, but he managed only two points in seven minutes in the tournament game, which he played with a cast on his left arm. IU surged out to an early seven-point lead before UK rallied to tie it at 44 by halftime. Despite Indiana's Kent Benson scoring 33 points (13-of-18) and grabbing 23 rebounds, Kentucky won by two points, 92–90. The game made USA Todays list of the greatest NCAA tournament games of all time. The win put Kentucky in the Final Four in San Diego, where they dropped the NCAA title game to UCLA in John Wooden's final game as head coach.

The loss for Indiana prevented what could have been back-to-back undefeated seasons and national championships as the Hoosiers went on to take the national title in 1976. Bob Knight would later say that this 1974–75 team was the best he ever coached, even better than the undefeated national champions of 1976.

Schedule and results

|-
!colspan=8 style=| Non-conference regular season
|-

|-
!colspan=8 style=| Big Ten regular season
|-

|-
!colspan=8 style=| NCAA Tournament

Rankings

Team players drafted into the NBA

References

Indiana Hoosiers
Indiana
Indiana Hoosiers men's basketball seasons
Indiana Hoosiers
Indiana Hoosiers